Block Communications Inc. (also known as Blade Communications) is an American privately held holding company of various assets, mainly in the print and broadcast media, based in Toledo, Ohio. The company was founded in 1900 in New York City when Paul Block, a German-Jewish immigrant who came to the United States fifteen years prior, formed an ad representation firm for newspapers. The Block empire grew to encompass many newspapers on the east coast of the US, however with the Great Depression in the 1930s came the loss of all but three properties: the ad representation firm, the Pittsburgh Post-Gazette, and the Toledo Blade (where Block eventually settled the company upon its purchase in 1927). After Block's death in 1941, his children took over the company. They eventually passed it on to their grandchildren, who continue to operate it to this day.

Company holdings

Newspapers
Pittsburgh Post-Gazette (Pittsburgh, Pennsylvania)
The Blade (Toledo, Ohio)

Television

Broadcast
Louisville, Kentucky
WDRB  (Fox/Antenna TV; operated by Block property Independence Television along with WBKI)
WBKI (The CW/Cozi TVMyNetworkTV/Movies!)

Lima/Findlay, Ohio
WLIO (NBC/Fox)
WOHL-CD (ABC/CBS) - the first single operator in a market to have all four major networks under one roof.
WPNM-LD Leipsic, Ohio*
WAMS-LD Minster, Ohio*

(*) - Serve as translators for WOHL to expand its coverage across the West Ohio TV market

Other markets
WAND Decatur, Illinois (NBC)
WFND-LD Toledo, Ohio (Youtoo America/Daystar)

Cable
Buckeye CableSystem, Inc.   (systems in Toledo, Ohio and Sandusky, Ohio, latter officially known as Erie County Cablevision)
Buckeye Express (High Speed Internet) 
Buckeye Cable Sports Network
HomeFinder Channel 100 cable; (Operated by Block property Buckeye Cablevision)

Online
Buckeye Access (Dial up Internet)
MaxxSouth Broadband
TeleSystem (formerly Buckeye Telesystem) 
Line Systems (Acquired July 2014 and now a division of Telesystem)

Non-Media
Metro Fiber & Cable Construction Company (a Toledo-based contractor of fiber optic installation)

Former properties
Pittsburgh Press
 Newark Daily Advertiser (Now The Star Ledger), Newark, New Jersey (owned from 1915 to 1939)
 WIIC-TV, Pittsburgh, Pennsylvania (founded by the Pittsburgh Post-Gazette; now Cox-owned WPXI)
 WWSW radio, Pittsburgh (also founded by the Pittsburgh Post-Gazette; now iHeartMedia-owned WBGG)
 WLFI-TV, West Lafayette, Indiana (sold to LIN TV Corporation; now owned by Heartland Media)
 Corporate Protection Services (Sold to Guardian Alarm Co. of Toledo  which later was sold to Asset Protection Services, Toledo, Ohio)
 The Monterey County Herald, traded to Scripps in exchange for the Pittsburgh Press; now owned by Digital First Media
Toledo 5, Toledo, Ohio (operated as a cable-only The WB/CW affiliate by Buckeye CableSystem; affiliation, channel slot and programming sold to SJL Broadcasting on September 1, 2013 and moved over-the-air to WTVG-DT2)
KTRV Nampa-Boise, Idaho (Sold to Ion Media)
WBKI-TV Campbellsville/Louisville, Kentucky (CW; owned by L.M. Communications, but operated by Block through WDRB/WMYO through a shared services agreement where WMYO duplicated its channels for the main portion of the Louisville market. Station was sold in spectrum auction and went off-air on October 25, 2017; rights to programming and CW affiliation were sold to Block, which retains WBKI's programming and call sign over WMYO's channel spectrum.)

References

External links
Company homepage

Mass media companies of the United States
Television broadcasting companies of the United States
Newspaper companies of the United States
Privately held companies of the United States
Companies based in Toledo, Ohio
Mass media companies established in 1900
1900 establishments in New York City
Family-owned companies of the United States